Piano Tiles (known on iOS as Piano Tiles – Don't Tap the White Tile and on Android as Don't Tap the White Tile) is a single-player mobile game launched on 28 March 2014 by Umoni Studio, specifically by creator Hu Wen Zeng. The game contains six modes; these modes are Classic mode; the Arcade mode; the Zen mode; the Rush mode; the Arcade+ mode (which includes the Bomb, Lightning, Bilayer, and Double tiles); and the Relay mode. In late April 2014 the game was the most downloaded application on both the iOS and Android platforms. In early July it was released for Windows Phone.

A sequel, Piano Tiles 2, was created by Hu Wen Zeng and launched by Cheetah Mobile on 19 August 2015.

Gameplay 

Piano Tiles is a game where the player's objective is to tap on the black tiles as they appear from the top of the screen while avoiding the white. 
When each black tile is tapped, it will emit a piano sound. If the player taps on a white tile, the player will lose the game which is signaled by an off-tune note.

References

External links 
 Home page
 Piano Tiles on the App Store

Video games developed in China
2014 video games
IOS games
Android (operating system) games
Windows Phone games